Gladioferens is a genus of copepods in the family Centropagidae, found in coastal marine and lagoon habitats in the Southern hemisphere. It contains the following species:  

Gladioferens antarcticus Bayly, 1994
Gladioferens imparipes Thomson, 1946
Gladioferens inermis Nicholls, 1944
Gladioferens pectinatus (Brady, 1899)
Gladioferens spinosus Henry, 1919
Gladioferens symmetricus Bayly, 1963

References

Centropagidae